Semaan (Syriac Aramaic: ܫܡܥܘܢ Šemʿōn ; , Semʻān) (also spelled Sem'an, Semán, Simaan, Sim'an, Samaan, Samman, Sam'an, Sima'an) is a Christian surname mainly found in the Levant area of the Middle East. It is derived from the Semitic root word/verb sema or shema, which means “to hear”; thus, the meaning of Semaan becomes “the one who hears or listens” in both Syriac Aramaic and Arabic.

In the Middle East today, the overwhelming majority of people who hold the Semaan surname are Christians who belong to early Christian churches such as the Syriac Orthodox Church, the Greek Orthodox Church of Antioch, the Melkite Greek Catholic Church of Antioch, the Maronite Catholic Church, the Chaldean Catholic Church, the Assyrian Orthodox Church, and the Coptic Orthodox Church. The ethnic origin of Semaan families varies by geographic location, most prevalent of which is Greek-Syrian, descendants of the Byzantine Greek (Rûm) population of the Syrian tetrapolis (Antioch, Seleucia Pieria, Apamea, and Laodicea).

Origins and History of Semaan Families

Semaans of Antioch and Syria
The Semaans of Antioch and Syria have roots that can be traced back to the early days of Christianity, to 1st century Antioch and Damascus. As Luke the Evangelist, a native of Antioch, writes in Acts of the Apostles, "the disciples were called Christians first in Antioch" (Acts 11:26). Although the majority of Semaans of Syria is of Greek-Syrian and Syriac (Aramaean) origin and known to have come from the north of Syria (Antioch area), however, a very small minority of Ghassanid Christian Arab descent (from the 3rd century) reside in the southern part (Hauran area).

Some Semaans of Antioch claim descent from Saint Peter (Heb: Shimeon Kefa, Syr: Semaan Kefa, Grk: Symeon Kephas, Eng: Simon Peter), the preeminent disciple of Christ. The story is based on oral tradition that claims that Saint Peter, avoiding persecution in his homeland, left his family with the Hellenized Jewish community of Antioch during his seven-year stay in the city before his travel to Rome. Some others claim that they're related to Saint Simeon Stylites, a popular ascetic Syrian saint during the Byzantine empire.

Antioch’s history of continuous falls and captures by Arabs, Seljuk Turks, Crusaders, and Mamluk Turks led to many Semaans fleeing their native city to neighboring areas in Syria and Lebanon. In 1939, Turkey annexed the Hatay province, which includes Antakya (Antioch), after Syria had control over the territory since the end of World War I.

Today, the Semaans of Syria are scattered throughout, and they live in cities such as Latakia (Laodiceia), Homs (Emesa), Aleppo, and Damascus.

Semaans of Lebanon
The Semaans of Lebanon can be broken down into five categories:

a)	Semaans of South Lebanon are a mix of Galilean Christians of Israel from the 1st century (Marjayoun area) as well as Greek-Phoenician (Canaanite) Christians of the 2nd century (Sidon area). Many Semaan families have immigrated to Western nations and South America.

b)	Semaans of East Lebanon (Bekaa Valley) are part of the Greek-Syrian Semaans of Antioch and Syria (1st century Antioch) who escaped religious persecution in Syria, especially during the Ottoman Empire and the repercussions of the 18th century split of the Melkite Greek Catholics from the Greek Orthodox Church of Antioch. They now live in the Bekaa region (Zahlé area), Beirut, Mount Lebanon, and around the world.

c)	Semaans of Byblos are of Greek-Phoenician (Canaanite) origin of the 1st century.

d)	Semaans of North Lebanon (Kaftoun, Koura) are of Ghassanid Christian Arab heritage settling first in the southern part of Syria (3rd century) before taking refuge in the mountains of Lebanon (7-8th century).

Semaans of Israel/Palestine
The Semaans of Israel/Palestine can be broken down geographically as follows:

a)	Semaans of Beit Lahem (Bethlehem) are early Galilean Christians from the 1st century who, at one point in time, lived in the villages of Galilee, before settling in Bethlehem in the 9th century. There are very few left in Bethlehem today, as most have emigrated, mainly to Venezuela and Honduras.

b)	Simaans of Haifa, Akko (Acre), Nazareth, and the rest of Galilee are mostly Galilean Christians from the 1st century. The majority has immigrated to Lebanon, Australia, and the United States.

c)	Semaans of Urashalim (Jerusalem) are mainly descendants of 1st century Galilean Christians who belong to the Syriac Orthodox Church of Jerusalem. Only a few remain as the majority has immigrated to the United States and Canada or moved to Jordan.

Simaans of Jordan
The Simaans of Jordan are mainly of Ghassanid Christian Arab descent from Yemen who settled in Jordan and southern Syria in the 3rd century. Some Jerusalemite Semaans of Galilean ancestry escaped the violence following the establishment of Israel in 1948 by relocating to Jordan.

Semaans of Iraq
The Semaans of Iraq (Mesopotamia) are mainly Chaldeans and Assyrians from Mosul and Tel Keppe, in the north of Iraq, who can trace their ancestry back to the 2nd century. Today, most Semaans of Mosul and Iraq have left, especially after the American-led 2003 invasion of Iraq and the ensuing anti-Christian backlash, to places such as Lebanon, Sweden, and the United States.

Semaans of Iran
The Semaans of Iran (Persia) are mainly Chaldeans from northern Mesopotamia who traveled east and settled in Iran in two waves; the first one was during the 5th century to escape the Greco-Roman persecution of non-Chalcedonian Assyro-Chaldean Christians, and the second one was during the 16th century to escape the Turkish persecution of Christian minorities during the Ottoman Empire. However, today, there are only very few left.

Semaans of Egypt
The Semaans of Egypt are Copts and Greek-Egyptian Christians from Alexandria, Aswan, and Cairo. Some can trace their ancestry to 1st century Alexandria, and the establishment of Christianity there by Saint Mark. Today, many Semaans have also immigrated to Western countries.

See also
 Simon
 Simon Peter (Semaan Boutros)
 Simon the Zealot (Semaan l-Ghayour)
 Simeon the Elder (Semaan l-Shaykh)
 Simeon of Jerusalem (Semaan l-Urashalimi)
 Simon of Cyrene (Semaan l-Qayrawani)
 Simon Magus (Semaan l-Saḥer)
 Simeon Stylites (Semaan l-Aamoudi)
 Simeon Stylites the Younger (Semaan l-Aamoudi l-Asghar)
 Simeon Stylites III (Semaan l-Aamoudi l-Thalith)
 Simeon the Holy Fool (Semaan l-Majnoun)
 Simon the Tanner (Semaan l-Dabbagh)
 Simeon Seth (Semaan Sheyth)
 Assemani (As-Semaani), a prominent "Simeonite" family of Lebanese Maronites from the 18th century, publishers at the Vatican Library
 Youhannan Semaan Issayi, Archbishop of Tehran of the Chaldean Catholics
 Jabal Semaan, Syria, Mount Simeon district in northern Syria, home to Eastern Mediterranean's most populous city, Aleppo
 Deir Semaan, St. Simeon's monastery, one of the world's oldest churches and the oldest surviving Byzantine church
 Alice Semaan, first Christian female parliamentarian in Bahrain

References

Surnames
Given names
Lebanese families